Joseph Fotso Kamto (otherwise known as Fotso; born January 3, 1983) is a Cameroonian footballer currently playing for Asswehly S.C. in the Libyan Premier League.

Clubs 
 Tonnerre KC Yaoundé
 NK Brotnjo
 MC Oran
 Alakhdhar S.C.
 Asswehly S.C.

References

External links 
 

1983 births
Living people
Cameroonian footballers
MC Oran players
Cameroonian expatriate footballers
Expatriate footballers in Algeria
Expatriate footballers in Bosnia and Herzegovina
Expatriate footballers in Libya
Cameroonian expatriate sportspeople in Libya
Asswehly S.C. players
Association football forwards
Libyan Premier League players